The Yenakiieve tram system, located in Yenakiieve, Ukraine, opened on May 24, 1932. As of 2010 it has three routes, 32.7 km and 37 rail cars.

Routes
 Red Town - Cheryomushki (101 quarter)
 Mine "Red October" - Cheryomushki (101 quarter)
 Center (Voyenkomat) - District behalf Braylyana

See also 
List of town tramway systems in Ukraine

1932 establishments in the Soviet Union
Yenakiieve
Railway lines opened in 1932
Tram transport in Ukraine
Yenakiieve